Polygona is a genus of sea snails, marine gastropod mollusks in the family Fasciolariidae, the spindle snails, the tulip snails and their allies.

Species
Species within the genus Polygona include:
 Polygona abbotti (Snyder, 2003)
 Polygona anapetes (Woodring, 1964)
 Polygona angulata (Röding, 1798)
 Polygona bayeri (Petuch, 2001)
 Polygona bernandensis (Bullock, 1974)
 Polygona brevicaudata (Reeve, 1847)
 Polygona concentrica (Reeve, 1847)
 † Polygona crassa (Michelotti, 1847) 
 Polygona devyanae (Rios, Costa & Calvo, 1994)
 Polygona filosa (Schubert & Wagner, 1829)
 Polygona infundibulum (Gmelin, 1791)
 Polygona jucunda (McGinty, 1940)
 Polygona lactea (Matthews-Cascon, Matthews & Rocha, 1991)
 † Polygona lynchii (Basterot, 1825) 
 Polygona martini (Snyder, 1988)
 Polygona nemata (Woodring, 1928)
 Polygona paulae Petuch, 2013
 Polygona socorroensis (Hertlein & Strong, 1951)
 Polygona tumens (Carpenter, 1856)
 Polygona vermeiji (Petuch, 1986)
 † Polygona zahlbruckneri (Glibert, 1963) 
Species brought into synonymy
 Polygona bessei Petuch, 2013: synonym of Lamellilatirus sunderlandorum Lyons & Snyder, 2013
 Polygona fusiformis Schumacher, 1817: synonym of Polygona infundibulum (Gmelin, 1791)

References

External links
 Schumacher, C. F. (1817). Essai d'un nouveau système des habitations des vers testacés. Schultz, Copenghagen. iv + 288 pp., 22 pls.
 Couto D., Bouchet P., Kantor Yu.I., Simone L.R.L. & Giribet G. (2016). A multilocus molecular phylogeny of Fasciolariidae (Neogastropoda: Buccinoidea). Molecular Phylogenetics and Evolution. 99: 309-322

Fasciolariidae